Salah Al-Humaidi (born 1 December 1974) is a Yemeni judoka, he competed internationally for Yemen at the 1992 Summer Olympics.

Career
Al-Humaidi was just 17 years old when he competed in the 60kg division at the 1992 Summer Olympics, he was drawn against Frenchman Philippe Pradayrol in round 32 in which he lost so didn't advance to the next round.

References

External links
 

1974 births
Living people
Yemeni male judoka
Olympic judoka of Yemen
Judoka at the 1992 Summer Olympics